Quassar was a Mexican airline which operated from 1992 to 1995. It operated scheduled and charter services throughout Mexico and the USA.

Destinations
Acapulco
Cancun
Cozumel
Guadalajara
Leon
Mexico City
Miami
Tijuana

Fleet
Boeing 727

References

External links
Basic details regarding Quassar de Mexico

Defunct airlines of Mexico
Airlines established in 1992
Airlines disestablished in 1995
1992 establishments in Mexico
1995 disestablishments in Mexico